The women's keirin competition of the cycling events at the 2019 Pan American Games was held on August 2 at the Velodrome.

Schedule

Results

First round
First 2 riders in each heat qualify to Final 1-6  and the others to First Round Repechage.

Heat 1

Heat 2

First round repechage
First 2 riders qualify to Final 1-6

Finals
The final classification is determined in the medal finals.

Finals 7–12

Finals 1–6

References

Track cycling at the 2019 Pan American Games
Women's keirin